The 2009 Miami Dolphins season was the franchise's 40th season in the National Football League, the 44th overall and the second under head coach Tony Sparano. The Dolphins entered the 2009 season as the reigning AFC East champions after posting an 11–5 record in 2008.  Dropping by four more games, the Dolphins failed to make the playoffs for the first time since 2007, marking the 25th consecutive year that the region hosting the Super Bowl did not see its host team play in, thus it set off a playoff drought that lasted until 2016. (not counting years where Super Bowls have been played on neutral sites).

Offseason personnel moves

Coaching staff
The Dolphins fired offensive line coach Mike Maser on January 14, 2009, just one year after he was hired to head coach Tony Sparano's staff. During Maser's lone season with the Dolphins, the team had the 12th-best offense in the league with 345.6 yards per game. A day after firing Maser, the team hired Dave DeGuglielmo, who had been the assistant offensive line coach for the New York Giants, as their new offensive line coach.

After kicking coach Steve Hoffman left the team to join the Kansas City Chiefs, the Dolphins hired University of Rhode Island head coach Darren Rizzi as the assistant special teams coach on February 21.

Players

Re-signings
January 5 – Re-signed wide receiver Anthony Armstrong, cornerback Scorpio Babers, cornerback Will Billingsley, fullback Chris Brown, defensive tackle Joe Cohen, running back Lex Hilliard and wide receiver Todd Lowber.
February 20 – Re-signed offensive tackle Vernon Carey.
February 25 – Re-signed linebacker Channing Crowder.
February 27 – Re-signed safety Yeremiah Bell.
May 16 – Signed fullback Lousaka Polite to a multi-year extension.
May 26 – Signed cornerback Will Allen to a multi-year extension.
June 22 – Signed safety Tyrone Culver to a multi-year extension.

Signings
January 6 – Claimed linebacker Tearrius George off waivers from the New Orleans Saints.
January 19 – Signed safety Ethan Kilmer (Bengals) and linebacker Cameron Wake (BC Lions).
February 25 – Signed safety Gibril Wilson (Raiders).
February 27 – Signed guard Joe Berger (Cowboys).
March 3 – Signed center Jake Grove (Raiders).
March 12 – Signed cornerback Eric Green (Cardinals).
April 25 – Signed punter Jy Bond (Australia).
May 13 – Signed linebacker Jason Taylor (Redskins).

Departures
February 10 – Waived guard Matt McChesney and linebacker Kelvin Smith.
March 2 – Terminated the contract of defensive end Vonnie Holliday.
April 27 – Released quarterback John Beck.
June 1 – Released wide receiver Todd Lowber.
June 15 – Released cornerback Scorpio Babers and punter Jy Bond.

Trades
March 19 – Acquired defensive tackle Tony McDaniel from the Jacksonville Jaguars in exchange for seventh-round pick in the 2009 NFL Draft.
March 23 – Traded center Samson Satele to the Oakland Raiders in exchange for a sixth-round pick and a swap of fourth-round picks in the 2009 NFL Draft.

Free agents
UFA: Unrestricted free agent, RFA: Restricted free agent, ERFA: Exclusive-rights free agent

2009 NFL Draft
Originally slated to have the 26th overall pick in the 2009 NFL Draft, the Dolphins' pick moved up one spot to 25th after the Arizona Cardinals and Philadelphia Eagles made it to the NFC Championship. Both the Cardinals (9–7) and Eagles (9–6–1) were projected to pick before the Dolphins (11–5), but with one guaranteed to make the Super Bowl (and thus pick 31st or 32nd depending on the outcome) the Dolphins moved up one position in the draft.

Notes
The Dolphins acquired Washington's 2009 second-round pick when they traded defensive end Jason Taylor in July 2008.
The Dolphins traded their 2009 sixth-round pick to the Dallas Cowboys when they acquired defensive tackle Jason Ferguson in February 2008.
The Dolphins acquired Cleveland's 2009 seventh-round pick when they traded cornerback Travis Daniels in August 2008.
The Dolphins acquired Carolina's 2009 seventh-round pick when they traded quarterback Josh McCown in August 2008.
The Dolphins traded its second-round selection (56th overall) to Indianapolis for their second- and fifth-round selection (61st and 165th overall, respectively).
The Dolphins traded their second 2009 seventh-round selection (237th pick) to Kansas City for a 2010 seventh-round selection.

Draft pick signings
May 21 – Signed tight end John Nalbone to a four-year contract.
June 18 – Signed offensive tackle Andrew Gardner to a four-year contract.
July 3 – Signed wide receiver Patrick Turner to a four-year contract.
July 3 – Signed linebacker J. D. Folsom to a four-year contract.
July 15 – Signed wide receiver Brian Hartline to a four-year contract.
July 24 – Signed cornerback Sean Smith to a four-year contract.
August 1 – Signed cornerback Vontae Davis to a five-year contract.
August 2 – Signed quarterback Pat White to a four-year contract.
August 2 – Signed safety Chris Clemons to a four-year contract.

Undrafted free agents
Following the 2009 NFL Draft, the Dolphins signed the following nine undrafted free agents on April 30:

The team later signed guard J. D. Quinn (Montana) on May 11. Two of the undrafted rookies left the team shortly after signing, with Bronson failing to report to training camp on August 2 and Rogers opting for retirement on August 6.

Training camp and preseason

Opening camp roster

Final preseason roster

Transactions
August 2 – Waived guard J. D. Quinn and placed tight end Jared Bronson on the Reserve/Did Not Report list.
August 4 – Placed linebacker Matt Roth on the Active/Non-Football Injury list.
August 5 – Waived/injured wide receiver Brennan Marion.
August 6 – Waived fullback Chris Brown and signed fullback Matt Quillen.
August 6 – Placed wide receiver Brennan Marion on injured reserve. and offensive tackle SirVincent Rogers on the Reserve/Retired list.
August 10 – Waived fullback Matt Quillen and signed wide receiver James Robinson and placekicker Connor Barth.
August 11 – Signed fullback Joe Kowalewski.
August 12 – Placed safety Ethan Kilmer on the Commissioner's Exemption list.
August 19 – Released cornerback Eric Green.
August 19 – Moved safety Ethan Kilmer to the Reserve/Left Squad list.
August 24 – Waived running back Anthony Kimble, nose tackle Joe Cohen, linebacker Tearrius George and linebacker Orion Martin.
August 24 – Waived/injured wide receiver Chris Williams.
August 24 – Traded offensive lineman Andy Alleman and Ikechuku Ndukwe to the Kansas City Chiefs in exchange for an undisclosed 2010 NFL Draft pick.
August 25 – Released wide receiver Chris Williams with an injury settlement.
August 29 – Waived wide receiver Anthony Armstrong, nose tackle Louis Ellis and placekicker Connor Barth.
August 29 – Waived/injured fullback Joe Kowalewski.
September 1 – Placed fullback Joe Kowalewski on injured reserve.
September 5 – Waived or released safety Courtney Bryan, offensive tackle Brandon Frye, linebacker William Kershaw, wide receiver Brandon London, cornerback Joey Thomas, defensive end Rodrique Wright, offensive tackle Nate Garner, cornerback Will Billingsley, defensive end Ryan Baker, guard Mark Lewis, linebacker J. D. Folsom and wide receiver James Robinson.

Preseason

Schedule

Regular season

Schedule

Standings

Game results

Week 1: at Atlanta Falcons

After a great season for the Miami Dolphins in 2008, the Dolphins went to the Georgia Dome to take on 2008 playoff contenders, the Atlanta Falcons.
After a scoreless first quarter, the Falcons got on the board with a 1-yard touchdown pass from Matt Ryan to fullback Ovie Mughelli in the second quarter. They also got a 36-yard field goal by kicker Jason Elam to make the score 10–0 at halftime. In the third quarter, Mike Peterson intercepted a Chad Pennington pass, which set up a 20-yard touchdown pass to tight end Tony Gonzalez and a 50-yard field goal by Jason Elam to make the score 19–0. Chad Pennington then hit a 9-yard touchdown pass to Ricky Williams.

The Falcons won the game 19–7 as the Dolphins started their season 0–1.

In 2008, no other team turned the ball over less than the Dolphins with only 13 turnovers, but in Week 1 Miami's offense had 4 turnovers, without having a single turnover on defense.

Week 2: vs. Indianapolis Colts

After a miserable loss to the Atlanta Falcons, the Dolphins host their home opener to the Indianapolis Colts. On the first play from scrimmage, Peyton Manning threw an 80-yard touchdown pass to tight end Dallas Clark. The Dolphins answered with a 14-yard touchdown run by Ronnie Brown out of the Wildcat Offense. The Dolphins and Colts kept going back and forth at each other with two field goals by Dan Carpenter and Adam Vinatieri to make the score 13–13 at halftime. After a scoreless third quarter, Ronnie Brown ran 2-yards for a touchdown to put Miami up 20–13. The Colts answered back with a 15-yard touchdown run by rookie running back Donald Brown. Miami than hit a 45-yard field goal by Dan Carpenter. But the Colts took the lead thanks to a 48-yard touchdown pass to Pierre Garçon. The Dolphins tried to rally at the end of the game but Chad Pennington was intercepted by Antoine Bethea to secure the Colts' victory.

The Colts won the game 27–23 as the Dolphins dropped to 0–2.

The Dolphins dominated the game in the time of possession battle, but lost the game with almost 50 minutes of offensive possession.

Week 3: at San Diego Chargers

Looking for their first win of the season, the Dolphins traveled to Qualcomm Stadium to take on the San Diego Chargers.

After a scoreless first quarter, Nate Kaeding hit a 25-yard field goal to score the first points of the game. Miami answered with a 24-yard field goal to tie the game at halftime 3–3. Miami took the lead after a 23-yard field goal by Dan Carpenter. But the Chargers retook the lead with a 5-yard touchdown run by Philip Rivers. The Chargers pulled away in the fourth quarter with two Nate Kaeding field goals and a 31-yard interception return by safety Eric Weddle. The Dolphins got a 14-yard touchdown run by Ricky Williams, but couldn't make a comeback.

The Chargers won the game 23–13 as the Dolphins fell to 0–3.

Dolphins quarterback Chad Pennington left the game with a shoulder injury after being hit by linebacker Kevin Burnett and was out for the season. The Dolphins chose Chad Henne to lead the Dolphins for the rest of the season.

Week 4: vs. Buffalo Bills

The Miami Dolphins came off of a 0–3 start and tried to rebound against the Buffalo Bills. After a scoreless first quarter the Dolphins rallied quick with a 23-yard interception return for a touchdown by rookie Vontae Davis and a 1-yard touchdown run by Ronnie Brown along with a 33-yard field goal by Dan Carpenter making the halftime score 17–3. Miami continued with a Chad Henne touchdown pass to Brian Hartline and a 1-yard touchdown run by Ricky Williams. Trent Edwards hit Josh Reed for a 3-yard touchdown but Miami ended the game with a 1-yard touchdown run by Ronnie Brown.

The Dolphins won the game 38–10 as the team improved to 1–3.

Chad Henne made his first NFL start and threw for 115 yards and a touchdown.

Week 5: vs. New York Jets

Ronnie Brown ran in for the winning touchdown with just seconds left to send the Dolphins into their bye week at 2–3.

Week 6: BYE

Week 7: vs. New Orleans Saints

After they passed on signing him during the 2006 offseason, this was Saints quarterback Drew Brees' first time playing in Miami. With the surprising loss, the Dolphins dropped to 2–4.

Week 8: at New York Jets

With their season sweep over the Jets, the Dolphins improved to 3–4.

Week 9: at New England Patriots

With the loss, the Dolphins dropped to 3–5.

Week 10: vs. Tampa Bay Buccaneers

With the win, the Dolphins improved to 4–5.

Week 11: at Carolina Panthers

With the win, the Dolphins improved to 5–5.

Week 12: at Buffalo Bills

With the loss, the Dolphins fell to 5–6.

Week 13: vs. New England Patriots

With the win, the Dolphins improved to 6–6.

Week 14: at Jacksonville Jaguars

With the win, the Dolphins improved to 7–6.

Week 15: at Tennessee Titans

With the loss, the Dolphins dropped to 7–7.

Week 16: vs. Houston Texans

With the loss, the Dolphins dropped to 7–8.

Week 17: vs. Pittsburgh Steelers

The final outcome of this game had somewhat of a domino effect.  It resulted in the Dolphins' elimination from the post-season (including Super Bowl XLIV, which they hosted February 8, 2010), and also, by virtue of the final standings' tiebreaker (as the result of the Baltimore Ravens defeating the Oakland Raiders), the Steelers themselves being dethroned of their world title defense.

The Dolphins ended their season in 3rd place in the AFC East as they finished the season 7–9.

Transactions

Staff

Final roster

References

External links
 Miami Dolphins Official Website
 2009 Miami Dolphins season at Pro Football Reference
 2009 Miami Dolphins season at ESPN

Miami
Miami Dolphins seasons
Miami Dolphins